Deaf sports can refer to:
Deaf Sports Australia
Deaf Sports New Zealand
Malaysian Deaf Sports Association
South African Deaf Sports Federation
Turkish Deaf Sport Federation

Deaf sports (disambiguation)